The 1990 Greenlandic Men's Football Championship was the 20th edition of the Greenlandic Men's Football Championship. The final round was held in Nuuk. It was won by Nuuk IL for the fifth time in its history.

First round

Group A

Group B

Group C

Group D

Group E

Group F

Second round

Group A

NB Two match results are unavailable.

Group B

Group C

Group D

Group E

Final round

Pool 1

Pool 2

Playoffs

Semi-finals

Fifth-place match

Third place match

Final

See also
Football in Greenland
Football Association of Greenland
Greenland national football team
Greenlandic Men's Football Championship

References

Greenlandic Men's Football Championship seasons
Green
Green
Foot